George Edward Ray (born 13 October 1993) is a professional footballer who plays as a defender for EFL League Two club Barrow. Born in England, he has represented Wales at youth level. 

Ray started his professional career at Crewe Alexandra and made his first-team debut in the 2013 Football League Trophy Final, becoming the first player to make his professional debut in a cup final held at Wembley.

Club career

Crewe Alexandra
Ray came through the Crewe Alexandra F.C. Academy to sign professional forms in 2011. He was loaned out to Northern Premier League side Leek Town in the 2011–12 season. He made his senior debut for the "Railwaymen" at Wembley Stadium on 7 April 2013, in the Football League Trophy final victory over Southend United – the first player to make his professional debut in a Wembley cup final. On 11 February 2014, Ray signed a new two-and-a-half-year deal at Crewe Alexandra.

In March 2017, Ray revealed that he had considered leaving Crewe, declaring "the first six months (of the current season) were the worst times of my career," but was now playing for a new contract under Crewe's new manager. David Artell had replaced Steve Davis in January 2017 and he recalled Ray to the first team and then made him team captain following an injury to Danny Hollands in February 2017. On 9 May 2017, Crewe announced that Ray had been offered a new contract by the club, and in June 2017 he signed a two-year deal running to June 2019.

Ray suffered a back injury at the end of the 2016-2017 season that required prolonged treatment and kept him out of first-team action until early 2018. He made his first appearance of the season at Lincoln City on 24 February 2018. On 5 May 2018, Ray appeared in a Crewe starting 11 who were all Crewe Academy graduates, one of two players (with Ben Garratt) to feature both times this has been achieved. At the end of the 2018-19 season, he declined a new deal and was set to leave the club.

Tranmere Rovers
On 24 June 2019, Ray signed a two-year deal with League One side Tranmere Rovers, becoming Micky Mellon's first signing of the season. He made his debut in an opening day loss to Rochdale. He scored his first goal for the club in an EFL Trophy tie against Aston Villa U21 on 8 October 2019.

Exeter City
On 28 June 2021, Ray joined League Two side Exeter City on a free transfer following his release from Tranmere Rovers. He made his debut on the opening day of the season, helping his new side keep a clean sheet in a goalless draw with Bradford City. He scored his first goal for the club on 27 November 2021, in a 1–1 draw with Rochdale.

Leyton Orient (loan)
On 31 January 2022, Ray joined League Two Leyton Orient on loan until the end of the 2021–22 season.

Barrow
On 27 June 2022, Ray joined League Two club Barrow on a two-year deal having had his Exeter contract terminated by mutual consent.

International career
Ray was called up to the Wales under-21 side in March 2013, at the age of 19.

Career statistics

Honours
Crewe Alexandra
Football League Trophy: 2012–13

Tranmere Rovers
EFL Trophy runner-up: 2020–21

References

External links

1993 births
Living people
Footballers from Warrington
English people of Welsh descent
English footballers
Welsh footballers
Wales under-21 international footballers
Association football defenders
Crewe Alexandra F.C. players
Leek Town F.C. players
Tranmere Rovers F.C. players
Exeter City F.C. players
Leyton Orient F.C. players
Barrow A.F.C. players
Northern Premier League players
English Football League players